Carlos Oscar Pachamé (born 25 February 1944) is an Argentine former football player and coach, who played as a midfielder.

Playing career
As a player, Pachamé was a defensive midfielder for the Estudiantes de La Plata team that won three successive editions of the Copa Libertadores from 1968 to 1970, and the 1968 Copa Intercontinental. In those teams, he formed part of a fearsome midfield, along with Carlos Bilardo and Eduardo Flores.

He also played for the Argentina national team and Boca Juniors. Later in his career he had short spells with Quilmes, Lanús, Independiente Medellin and Rochester Lancers.

Coaching career
After retirement, Pachamé became a coach. Under Pachamé, the Argentina under-20 team took second place in the 1983 U-20 World Cup. He was an assistant coach, during the tenure of Carlos Bilardo as the coach of the Argentina, when the team won the 1986 FIFA World Cup in Mexico and finished second in the 1990 FIFA World Cup in Italy.

Managerial statistics

Honours
 Estudiantes de La Plata
 Argentine Primera: Metropolitano 1967
 Copa Libertadores: 1968, 1969, 1970
 Copa Intercontinental: 1968
 Copa Interamericana: 1969

References

External links

Statistics at once-onze.narod.ru 
NASL Statistics

1944 births
Living people
Argentine footballers
Argentina international footballers
Association football defenders
Argentine Primera División players
Estudiantes de La Plata footballers
Boca Juniors footballers
Quilmes Atlético Club footballers
Club Atlético Lanús footballers
Rochester Lancers (1967–1980) players
Argentine football managers
J1 League managers
Avispa Fukuoka managers
Estudiantes de La Plata managers
Argentina national under-20 football team managers
Expatriate football managers in Japan
North American Soccer League (1968–1984) players